Micki Pistorius (born 19 March 1961 in Pretoria) is a South African forensic or investigative psychologist and author. She was the first woman in her profession and the first profiler in South Africa. She says she has "cryptesthesia", an extra-sensory perception for killers.

Early and personal life 
Pistorius grew up in Pretoria with several brothers and sisters. She worked as a journalist for eight years, before deciding to study psychology at the University of Pretoria, where she received a Masters in the subject, and also became a lecturer with a reputation for eccentricity. While doing her doctoral thesis on serial killers, the first in South Africa, she developed her theory linking Freudian psychosexual development with serial killing. She was married for eight years, but divorced as a result of work pressures after she became a profiler.

Career 
Pistorius joined the South African Police Service (SAPS) in 1994, where she founded and headed the Investigative Psych Unit as Chief Investigative Psychologist, a rank equivalent to colonel; she also founded the Serious and Violent Crimes Component. By 1997, she had trained over 100 detectives to investigate serial criminals, and two successors, including Elmarie Myburgh.

She was involved in more than thirty serial killer cases while at SAPS. Among the people whose cases she worked on are Norman Afzal Simons, Moses Sithole, David Selepe, Stewart Wilken, Sipho Thwala, Velaphi Ndlangamandla, Cedric Maake, and David Mmbengwa.

She developed post-traumatic stress disorder and consequently retired in 2000 to join a private investigation company. Gerrard Labuschagne took over from her. After quitting, she wrote Catch me a killer in order to "purify" herself of her experiences while profiling. She still consults for South African government agencies, and appears in court cases as a clinical psychologist.

Pistorius is recognised as one of the world's foremost psychological profilers, by people such as FBI profiler Robert Ressler.

Pistorius has empathy for serial killers, who she says are "not monsters; they are human beings with tortured souls. I will never condone what they do, but I can understand them." She participated in the training of nearly two hundred detectives in the investigation of serial homicides.

Books by Micki Pistorius
 Skimme in Die Skadu Penguin (SA) 2006 
 Profiling Serial Killers and other crimes in South Africa Penguin SA 2005 
 Fatal Females Penguin SA 2004 
 Strangers on the street Penguin SA 2002 
 Catch me a killer (autobiography) Penguin SA 2000 
 Sorg (historical novel) Penguin SA 2012

Books about Micki Pistorius
 Micki Pistorius une femme sur la trace des serial killers by Stéphane Bourgouin. (In French)

References

External links
 Who's who entry 

1961 births
Living people
People from Pretoria
Afrikaner people
Afrikaner Roman Catholics
Criminal psychologists
Forensic psychologists
Offender profiling
South African police officers
South African psychologists
South African Roman Catholics
South African women journalists
University of Pretoria alumni
South African criminologists
Women criminologists
South African women psychologists
South African journalists
Psychics